Koryčany is a town in Kroměříž District in the Zlín Region of the Czech Republic. It has about 2,700 inhabitants.

Administrative parts
Villages of Blišice, Jestřabice and Lískovec are administrative parts of Koryčany.

Geography
The eastern part of the municipal territory lies in the Litenčice Hills. The Kyjovka River flows through the town.

History

The first written mention of Koryčany is from 1321. In 1349, Koryčany was first referred to as a market town. The Cimburk Castle was built here between 1327 and 1333 and became the centre of the estate. In the 17th century the castle lost its importance, and in 1720 it was abandoned.

The Jewish population was first documented in 1567. The community was at its peak in the mid-19th century. The last four families disappeared as a result of the Holocaust.

In 1967, Koryčany was promoted to a town. The formerly separate municipalities of Jestřabice and Lískovec were joined to Koryčany in 1976.

Sights

The Cimburk Castle is a ruin of a Gothic-Renaissance castle. Today it is gradually repaired and is open to the public.

The Koryčany Castle was first mentioned 1611 as a fortress and manor house. It was built to replace the remote Gothic castle as the seat of the lordship. The fortress was rebuilt to a Baroque castle in 1677. In the late 18th century, the castle was extended, and ornamental garden and English park were founded. Today the castle complex is privately owned.

The Church of Saint Lawrence was first mentioned in 1350. Its present appearance dates from the second half of the 17th century.

The Jewish cemetery has about 200 tombstones. The oldest preserved tombstone is from 1674.

Notable people
Ignaz Grossmann (1825–1897), rabbi; served here in 1863–1866
Oskar Rosenfeld (1884–1944), Austrian-Jewish writer

Twin towns – sister cities

Koryčany is twinned with:
 Lehota, Slovakia

References

External links

Cities and towns in the Czech Republic
Populated places in Kroměříž District
Shtetls